Kohler Dome is a rounded, snow-covered elevation at  that rises slightly above the general level of the extreme eastern part of the Mount Moulton massif, in Marie Byrd Land, Antarctica. It was mapped by the United States Geological Survey from ground surveys and U.S. Navy air photos, 1959–66. The Advisory Committee on Antarctic Names named the formation after Robert E. Kohler of the U.S. Coast and Geodetic Survey, a geomagnetist/seismologist at Byrd Station, 1970.

References

Mountains of Marie Byrd Land
Flood Range